The People's Bank of Zanzibar (PBZ) is a commercial bank in Tanzania. It is licensed by the Bank of Tanzania, the central bank and national banking regulator.

Overview
, PBZ was a medium-sized financial institution, with total assets of approximately TSh 321.35 billion. At that time, the bank's shareholders' equity was about TSh 29.6 billion. The bank employed 236 full-time staff as of 30 June 2014.

History
The bank was founded in 1966 by the government of Zanzibar. It functions as a retail bank, serving individuals, small and medium enterprises (SMEs), and large corporate clients. Initially, its service area was limited to the islands of Zanzibar and Pemba.

In April 2011, the bank opened a branch in Dar es Salaam on the mainland. As of May 2012, it planned new branches in Mwanza, Arusha, Mtwara, and Mbeya.

In December 2011, the bank launched an Islamic bank window, in addition to the conventional banking services that it offers.

Ownership
PBZ is wholly owned by the government of Zanzibar.

Branch network

As of November 2014, The Peoples Bank of Zanzibar Limited maintains 11 branches at the following locations:

 Malindi Branch - Near Ministry of Agriculture, Zanzibar Main Branch
 Chake Chake Branch - Chake-Chake, Pemba
 Forodhani Branch - Forodhani Park, Zanzibar
 Mwanakwerekwe Branch - Mwanakwerekwe, Zanzibar
 Mkoani Branch - Zanzibar Port Authority Building, Zanzibar
 Wete Branch - Ground Floor, Zanzibar Electricity Corporation Building, Zanzibar
 Mlandege Branch - Muzammil Building, Mlandege
 Kariakoo Branch - Opposite Kariakoo Main Market, Zanzibar
 Dar es Salaam Branch I - Mbagala, Dar es Salaam
 Tazara Branch - Dar es Salaam, Junction of TAZARA
 Mtwara Branch - Mtwara

See also
 List of banks in Tanzania
 Bank of Tanzania
 Economy of Tanzania
 Islamic banking

References

External links 
Website of People's Bank of Zanzibar
Website of Bank of Tanzania ( website down)

Banks of Tanzania
Companies of Tanzania
Economy of Tanzania
Economy of Zanzibar
Banks established in 1966
1966 establishments in Tanzania